Lenwebbia is a genus of shrubs or small trees in the myrtle family Myrtaceae. The genus is named to honour the Australian plant ecologist Dr. Leonard Webb. The genus occurs in mesic forests along or near the east coast of Australia, from northern New South Wales to northeastern Queensland.

Both species in the genus were formerly classified in the genus Austromyrtus. Lenwebbia is distinct from Austromyrtus and Gossia in having four petals rather than five. 
Anatomical and genetic analyses have placed Lenwebbia as the sister genus to Lophomyrtus from New Zealand.

Species 
The following species are recognised in the genus Lenwebbia:
 Lenwebbia lasioclada - disjunct in northern New South Wales (NSW), southern and north-eastern Queensland. 
 Lenwebbia prominens - found in rainforests accociated with the Tweed Volcano in northern NSW and south-eastern Queensland.

References

 Snow, N., G. P. Guymer, G. Sawvel. 2003.  Systematics of Austromyrtus, Lenwebbia, and the Australian species of Gossia (Myrtaceae).  Syst. Bot. Monogr. 65: 1-95.
 Wilson Peter G. (Accessed 2007) Lenwebbia in: NSW Flora Online http://plantnet.rbgsyd.nsw.gov.au/
 S.G.A.P.(Qld Region)Logan River Branch Inc (2005) Mangroves to mountains. Volume 2. A field guide to the native plants of south-east Queensland Browns Plains, Qld.:Logan River Branch SGAP (Qld Region) Inc.581.99432 MAN
 Salywon et al. (2004) Phylogenetic relationships of Myrtaceae as inferred from nrDNA ITS sequence data Abstract (see links)

External links
 Lenwebbia in the Flora of NSW

Myrtaceae
Myrtaceae genera
Myrtales of Australia
Flora of Queensland
Flora of New South Wales
Endemic flora of Australia